Gale Hania (died 1380) was the thirteenth potestaat (or ruler) of Friesland, a province of Netherlands.

Biography
His name is also known written as Hanja or Hanya. Gale was born on the Hanya farm northeast of Pingjum, in the shire of Wonseradeel.  The path alongside this farm is now called the Hanialaan.

The nobles Sicke Gratinga and Gale Hania, were severely injured, and were taken back to Ludingakerk .

From the family Hania there are three signatories to the Covenant of the Nobles, Jorryt, Otto and Leo Hania.

See also

 List of rulers of Frisia

References
 Beknopte Geschiedenis Friesland Meindersma, D. 1852
 Historie van het Verbond der Edelen,  (History of the Covenant of the Nobles), JW te Water, Unit II, pages 447 en 448. 447 and 448.

Potestaats of Friesland
Year of birth missing
1380 deaths